FAM71D, also known as chromosome 14 open reading frame 54 (C14orf54), is a protein that in humans is encoded by the FAM71D gene on Chromosome 14. Orthologs of FAM71D reach as far back in evolution to Reptiles, however, it is closer in homology to primates than any other orthologs. FAM71D has 6 paralogs: FAM71A, FAM71B, FAM71C, FAM71E1, FAM71F1, and FAM71F2 which encode a protein of unknown function.

Gene

In humans,  FAM71D is located at 14q23.3 and stretches between positions 67189393 and 67228550 (span 39157 bp). It codes for at least 10 unique human protein isoforms: the primary isoform (422 aa; also denoted X1), isoform X2 (417 aa), isoform X3 (413 aa), isoform X4 (400 aa), isoform X5 (399 aa), isoform X6 (398 aa), isoform X7 (392 aa), isoform X8 (389 aa), isoform X9 (347 aa), isoform X10 (336 aa) In humans, FAM71D codes for an mRNA strand that is 1790 base pairs long. The human mRNA is composed of a 5' untranslated region that is 290 bases long and a 3' untranslated region that is 231 bases long The gene has the following neighbours on the same chromosome: 
MPP5: MAGUK p55 subfamily member 5 plays a role in tumour suppression and receptor clustering
GPHN: Gephyrin plays a role in anchoring inhibitory neurotransmitter receptors to postsynaptic cytoskeleton
AT6V1D: V-type proton ATPase subunit D, an enzyme that mediates acidifcation of eukaryotic intracellular organelles 
SF3B44P1: Splicing Factor 3b, Subunit 4 Pseudogene 1
LOC101927920: Probable Ribosome Biogenesis Protein RLP24-Like
LOC105370538: Uncharacterized protein
LOC105370541: Uncharacterized protein

Homology

Protein

The primary protein encoded by FAM71D in humans is 422 amino acids long with a molecular weight of 47076 Da. The protein is part of a functionally uncharacterized family of proteins (pfam 12480) with a domain of unknown function DUF3699.

Structure
Several tools are available to predict the secondary structure of a protein. One tool that combines the results of few of them is PELE on SDSC Biology WorkBench. According to this tool, the protein's secondary structure is mostly alpha helices, beta stands and coiled-coiled domains.

Post Translational Modifications
Like any other protein, this protein undergoes post-translational modifications. FAM71D is predicted to contain 2 nuclear export signals, and lacks both a signal peptide and transmembrane domains.

Interactions
FAM71D interacts with PGK2, TUBA3C, and HSPB1. FAM71D is also predicted to interact with the following proteins using STRING:

THUMPD3: THUMP domain containing 3
CCDC170: Coiled-coil domain containing 170
KLH10: Kelch-like 10
TMEM48: Transmembrane protein 48
SHCBP1L: SHC SH2-domain binding protein
ASNA1: arsA arsenite transporter 
PPP1R16A: Protein Phosphate 1, regulatory subunit 16A
IZUMO1: izumo sperm-egg fusion 1
SF3B2: Splicing factor 3b, submit 2
TUBB4B: Tubulin, beta 4B class IVb

Expression

FAM71D is primarily expressed in the testis of humans only expressed during the adult developmental stage. GEO microarray data also supports the expression of FAM71D in humans

Clinical Relevance

No studies have directly associated FAM71D protein with certain diseases. However, using NCBI GEO Profiles, FAM71D was found to be over-expressed in patients with unruptured intracranial aneurysms.

References

'

Genes on human chromosome 14